A joggle is a joint or projection that interlocks blocks (such as a lintel's stone blocks or an arch's voussoirs). 
Often joggles are semicircular and knob-shaped, so joggled stones have a jigsaw- or zigzag-like pattern.

Joggling can be found in pre-Frankish buildings, in Roman Spain and Roman France. 
In Islamic architecture, the earliest joggles were in the desert castles of the Umayyad Caliphate, such as Qasr al-Hayr al-Sharqi. 
In Mamluk architecture, joggling is usually combined with ablaq (alternating colors).
Joggling also characterize Ottoman architecture in Cairo.

The protruding joggle is also called a "he-joggle", whereas the corresponding slot is called a "she-joggle".

See also 
 Dovetail joint: dovetailing can be considered a type of joggling.

References 

Joinery
Masonry
Arabic architecture
Islamic architectural elements
Mamluk architecture
Ottoman architecture
Architecture in Egypt
Architecture in Syria
Architecture in the State of Palestine